He's a Rebel is the second album issued by girl group The Crystals in 1963, and also the second LP in the Philles catalogue. This was an effort to take an advantage of the monster hit "He's a Rebel" which went to #1 US in 1962, written by Gene Pitney. The song was actually recorded by The Blossoms with Darlene Love on lead vocals and attributed to The Crystals. Notably on the LP is "He Hit Me (It Felt Like a Kiss)," a withdrawn single by the "real" Crystals group.

This was actually a repackaging of Twist Uptown, The Crystals' debut. Two of the original eleven tracks were taken from that album and replaced with "He's a Rebel" and its follow-up "He's Sure the Boy I Love" (#11 US, also recorded with The Blossoms) while "He Hit Me" was added for a twelfth track. The He's a Rebel album peaked at #131 US.

Track listing

Side one
"He's a Rebel"- (2:25)
"Uptown"- (2:18)
"Another Country-Another World"- (3:00)
"Frankenstein Twist"- (2:47)
"Oh Yeah, Maybe Baby"- (2:23)
"He's Sure the Boy I Love"- (2:29)

Side two
"There's No Other (Like My Baby)"- (2:28)
"On Broadway"- (2:27)
"What a Nice Way to Turn Seventeen"- (2:40)
"No One Ever Tells You"- (2:16)
"He Hit Me (It Felt Like a Kiss)- (2:28)
"I Love You Eddie"- (2:55)

Personnel
Barbara Alston (w/ The Crystals)- Lead vocals
Darlene Love (w/The Blossoms)- Lead vocals on "He's a Rebel" and "He's Sure the Boy I Love"
Patricia "Patsy" Wright (w/The Crystals)- Lead vocals on "Oh Yeah, Maybe Baby"
LaLa Brooks (w/The Crystals)- Lead vocals on "Frankenstein Twist"
Phil Spector- Producer

Singles history
"There's No Other (Like My Baby)"/"Oh Yeah, Maybe Baby" (#20 US)
"Uptown"/"What a Nice Way to Turn Seventeen" (#13 US)
"He Hit Me (It Felt Like a Kiss)"/"No One Ever Tells You" (withdrawn)
"He's a Rebel"/"I Love You Eddie" (#1 US)
"He's Sure the Boy I Love"/"Walkin' Along (La-La-La)" (#11 US)

References

1962 albums
Albums produced by Phil Spector
Albums recorded at Gold Star Studios
Philles Records albums
The Crystals albums